Jesús Gruber (born 22 May 1936) is a Venezuelan fencer. He competed in the individual and team foil events at the 1960 Summer Olympics.

References

External links
 

1936 births
Living people
Venezuelan male foil fencers
Olympic fencers of Venezuela
Fencers at the 1960 Summer Olympics
People from Ciudad Bolívar
Pan American Games medalists in fencing
Pan American Games silver medalists for Venezuela
Pan American Games bronze medalists for Venezuela
Fencers at the 1959 Pan American Games
Fencers at the 1963 Pan American Games